David Tork (born August 25, 1934) is retired male pole vaulter from the United States. He set his personal best (5.08 metres) in the event on June 27, 1964, at a meet in New Brunswick, New Jersey.

References 
 trackfield.brinkster

1934 births
Living people
American male pole vaulters
Athletes (track and field) at the 1963 Pan American Games
World record setters in athletics (track and field)
Pan American Games gold medalists for the United States
Pan American Games medalists in athletics (track and field)
Medalists at the 1963 Pan American Games